Miss Guadeloupe International is a national Beauty pageant responsible for selecting Guadeloupe's representatives to the International pageants. This pageant is not related to Miss Guadeloupe where the winner traditionally competes at Miss France contest.

History

1977–1985
Miss Guadeloupe pageant has been known since 1977 when the island competed at the Miss Universe pageant. Since 1984 the island joins Miss France contest as overseas department of the country. In 1985 it boycotts to the Miss Universe pageant, because of the pageant does allow that island competing in a national competition as a region.

2003–present
Since 2003 Guadeloupe allows winners to compete at the Miss World contest. The "Miss International Guadeloupe" contest sends its winner to the Miss World. While runners-up might compete at the Miss International and Miss Earth pageants.

Titleholders

Color key

Miss Universe 
In 2021, The Miss Guadalupe International organization acquired the Miss Universe license to send its only representative to the Miss Universe pageant. The delegates will compete as "Miss Universe Sin Marteen & Guadalupe" in the pageant.

References

External links 
Official site

Guadeloupe
Guadeloupe
Guadeloupe
Guadeloupe
Recurring events established in 2003
Entertainment events in Guadeloupe
Women in Guadeloupe